The Order of Sport is a National Level Award established in 2019 by Canada’s Sports Hall of Fame and a symbol of the organization's purpose, to build Canada through the transformative power of sport. Canada’s Sports Hall of Fame created the Order of Sport award to modernize recognition and reflect the growing cultural significance of sport to Canadians; one that connects Canada’s greatest sports champions to the greater good.

Overview 
The Order of Sport, Canada's highest sporting honour, upgrades Induction into Canada’s Sports Hall of Fame, to one connecting sports and social purpose. The Order of Sport is a National Level Award established by Canada’s Sports Hall of Fame, a Nationally Accredited Sports Museum in Calgary, Alberta, Canada. The award supports the organization's statement of purpose, to Build Canada through the transformative power of sport and its mandate to raise the profile, visibility, and stature of Canadian sports champions, enabling them to return value to their communities as Canada’s Sport + Spirit Champions. This national level award recognizes Canadians who have achieved the highest level of sporting accomplishment and who have the purpose and passion for going beyond their sport success, educating all Canadians on the transformative power of sport. Commencing 2019, individuals inducted annually into Canada’s Sports Hall of Fame (Hall of Famers) receive the Order of Sport in recognition of their continuing role in building Canada through sport, beyond competition, and the impact they have on their communities.

In October 2019, Canada's Sports Hall of Fame presented the inaugural Order of Sport Award to the class of 2019; six athletes and two builders were awarded the Order of Sport.

The Order of Sport Symbol 
The Order of Sport symbol represents the broader and open-ended social purpose of Sport in Canada reflecting the growing cultural significance of sport to Canadians; one that connects Canada’s greatest sports champions to the greater good. Based on the 1967 Centennial design work of  Stuart Ash., Design Canada film maker and graphic designer Greg Durrell's Order of Sport logo represents the unifying power of sport for Canadians.

Order of Sport Regalia 
The recipients of the Order of Sport are recognized with the Order of Sport typographic scarf, a Trophy, Pin or Pendant.

References 

Awards established in 2019
Canadian sports trophies and awards